Tommy's Tale is a novel written by the actor Alan Cumming, centering on the life of a bisexual London resident named Tommy.

Contents 
The book is a first-person narrative, and revolves around an early mid-life crisis triggered when Tommy "accidentally" proclaims his love for his friend-with-benefits, Charlie, when high on ecstasy. Other characters include Finn (Charlie's son), Sadie and Bobby (Tommy's flatmates), India (Tommy's ex-girlfriend), and Julian (Tommy's boss).

References 

2002 British novels
British LGBT novels
Novels set in London
Novels about midlife crisis
2000s LGBT novels
Novels with bisexual themes
ReganBooks books